Jadwiga Doering (born November 2, 1938 in Podjazy) is a Polish sprint canoer who competed in the late 1960s. She finished ninth in the K-2 500 m event at the 1968 Summer Olympics in Mexico City.

References
 Sports-reference.com profile

1938 births
Canoeists at the 1968 Summer Olympics
Living people
Olympic canoeists of Poland
Polish female canoeists
People from Kartuzy County
Sportspeople from Pomeranian Voivodeship
20th-century Polish women